Margarita Ortega Valdés (Sonora, 1871 – Mexicali, 23 November 1913) was a Mexican weapons expert, markswoman, nurse, courier, spy, and the best-known magonist woman soldier. Ortega was born into a wealthy Sonoran family, headed by Dolores Valdés and Pablo Ortega. They moved to Baja California in 1891, where the following year, in Tecate, Ortega married Pascual Gortar. The couple had a daughter, Rosaura Gortari Ortega, before Pascual died. While Rosaura was still an infant, Ortega married again, to Manuel Demara, son of Antonio Demara of Tecate. In 1911, Ortega became member of the Mexican Liberal Party in Baja California, participating in the armed revolt against Porfirio Díaz. In 1913, the Mexican militia captured, tortured and killed Ortega.

References

Citations

Bibliography

1854 births
1913 deaths
Mexican anarchists
Magonists
People from Sonora
Women spies
Mexican women activists

Murdered anarchists